Muraena clepsydra, commonly known as the hourglass moray, is a moray eel found in coral reefs from the Gulf of California to Peru, and the Galapagos Islands. It was described by Charles Henry Gilbert in 1898.

Due to its wide distribution, lack of known threats, and lack of observed population decline, the IUCN redlist currently lists M. clepsydra as Least Concern.

References

clepsydra
Fish described in 1898